Roh Hoe-chan (31 August 1956 – 23 July 2018) was a South Korean politician. He was a member of the 17th, 19th, and 20th National Assemblies. Roh was involved with multiple progressive-leaning parties, lately with the Justice Party from 2012 until his death in 2018.

Early life 
Roh was born on 31 August 1956 in Busan into a middle-class household. He attended the prestigious Kyunggi High School in the 1970s. Afterwards, Roh went to college, taking part in political movements, and in 1982 was hired as a welder at a factory where he  organized the factory workers. Roh was instrumental in the formation of the Incheon Democratic Workers' Federation with the aim of creating the workers' party. He was jailed for 30 months after being caught by the government in 1989, accused of breaking the National Security Act.

Political career 
After serving his jail term, Roh was involved with the formation of progressive political parties in the 1990s, which later became the Democratic Labor Party in 2000.

He served as a member of the National Assembly from 2004 to 2008. He co-founded the New Progressive Party with Sim Sang-jung, Cho Seungsoo, and other members of the People's Democracy faction of the Democratic Labor Party. He unsuccessfully ran for Mayor of Seoul as a New Progressive Party candidate in 2010. He again served as a member of the National Assembly on behalf of the Unified Progressive Party and the Justice Party in 2012 to 2013. Roh broke with the Unified Progressive Party after allegations that the faction led by the party leader Lee Jung-hee had manipulated the party list to elect members of her own faction into the National Assembly. He, with Sim Sang-jeong and Rhyu Si-min, formed the Progressive Justice Party in October 2012, but in 2013 it became the Justice Party.

In 2005, he posted the names of the prosecutors implicated in corruption cases involving Samsung on the internet. He was charged with breaking Korea's communication secrecy act, and after a long legal battle, he was sentenced to 4 months in prison and given a 1-year suspended prison sentence in 2013.

He was again elected to the National Assembly, this time as a member of the Justice Party, in 2016.

In July 2018, Roh was under investigation into accusations that he had accepted  from an aide to an influential blogger known as "Druking" while at the center of an opinion-rigging scandal.

Personal life 

Roh married fellow labor activist Kim Ji-sun in 1988. The couple had no children. Roh was a cello player from his elementary school days, and often dreamed of a society where every citizen could pick up a musical instrument.

Death 
Roh committed suicide, aged 61, by jumping from his mother's apartment in Seoul on 23 July 2018. His death occurred during the course of the special prosecutor's investigations into the illegal political funds of Druking, the main perpetrator of the South Korean opinion-rigging scandal.

Roh's will, addressing the Justice Party and its membership, admitted receiving  (approximately US$35,300) from Druking's organization but denied any form of favoritism in exchange for the campaign contribution. According to Political Fund Act which he supported, it is still illegal and guilty because the amount of money he has received already exceeds the legitimate scope.

In response to his death, South Korean President Moon Jae-in said Roh had made “big contributions to widening the spectrum of [South] Korean politics".

References

External links 

Official website 

1956 births
2018 deaths
2018 suicides
Members of the National Assembly (South Korea)
Democratic Labor Party (South Korea) politicians
New Progressive Party (South Korea) politicians
Justice Party (South Korea) politicians
Ganghwa Noh clan
Liberalism in South Korea
Suicides by jumping in South Korea
South Korean progressives
South Korean politicians who committed suicide
South Korean social democrats
People from Busan